The Hawaii Tsunami were a soccer club that competed in the United Soccer Leagues
from 1994 to 1997. The club was based in Honolulu, Hawaii.

Year-by-year

In 1995, the Tsunami went 18–2, leading the USISL in both goals scored and goals against. Hawaii was also a perfect 10–0 at home. The Tsunami also won the Northwest Division championship and a berth in the Sizzling' Nine championships.

References

External links
 Tsunami Get Ready for a New Wave
 Tsunami aim to rebound  against Yakima Reds
 Tsunami open with BigFoot
 Tsunami might be on the verge of collapse

Defunct soccer clubs in Hawaii
USL Second Division teams
Association football clubs disestablished in 1997
Association football clubs established in 1994
1994 establishments in Hawaii
1997 disestablishments in Hawaii
Sports in Honolulu